The Plessur Alps are a mountain range in the Alps of eastern Switzerland. They are considered to be part of the Western Rhaetian Alps. They are named after the river Plessur, which originates from the center of the ranges. The Plessur Alps are separated from the Glarus Alps in the west by the Rhine valley; from the Rätikon range in the north by the Landquart river valley (Prättigau); from the Albula Alps in the south-east by the Landwasser river valley; from the Oberhalbstein Alps in the south by the Albula river valley.

The Plessur Alps are drained by the rivers Rhine, Plessur, Landwasser and Landquart. The ski resort Arosa lies in the middle of the range.

Peaks of the Plessur Alps are the Aroser Rothorn (highest) and Stätzer Horn.

A mountain pass in the Plessur Alps is the Strela Pass, from Davos to Langwies, elevation .

Peaks
The chief peaks of the Plessur Alps are:

Gallery

See also
Swiss Alps
Amselflue
Casanna

References
Swisstopo maps

External links

Mountain ranges of the Alps
Central Alps
Rhaetian Alps
Mountain ranges of Switzerland
Mountain ranges of Graubünden
Limestone Alps